TS2 SPACE is an Internet service provider for US Army soldiers in Iraq and Afghanistan. Most of its active customers are Polish and US Army soldiers; TS 2 methods have also been implemented for private companies and organizations. The TS 2 network in Iraq and Afghanistan has over 15,000 military users of local broadband satellite connections.

TS2 SPACE also provides telecommunication services for Multi-National Security Transition Command – Iraq (MNSTC-I).

Military customers in Iraq and Afghanistan
In 2007, TS2 SPACE solutions were implemented for numerous NATO military entities.

In 2009, TS2 SPACE began advertising satellite Internet services for the US Marine Corps in Afghanistan.

References

External links
 

Satellite Internet access
Internet in Iraq
Telecommunications companies of Afghanistan
Telecommunications companies of Iraq
Telecommunications companies of Poland
Companies based in Warsaw
Companies established in 2004
2004 establishments in Poland